Football Manager 2016 (abbreviated to FM16) is a football management simulation video game developed by Sports Interactive and published by Sega. It was released on Microsoft Windows, OS X and Linux on 13 November 2015.

Gameplay
FM16 features similar gameplay to that of the Football Manager series. Gameplay consists of taking charge of a professional association football team, as the team manager. Players can sign football players to contracts, manage finances for the club, and give team talks to players. FM16 is a simulation of real world management, with the player being judged on various factors by the club's AI owners and board.

In FM16, players can now customise the appearances of their manager on the pitch. Two new modes are introduced in FM2016, including the Fantasy Draft mode, in which multiple players can play together, and draft players with a fixed budget. The second mode is called Create-A-Club, originated from the Editor version of the game but was now included in the final game. Players can create their own club with kits, logos, stadiums and transfer budget. All of them can be customised by players.

Football Manager 2016 also features ProZone Match Analysis, which can provide analysis to matches. The feature was developed by Sports Interactive in conjunction with ProZone, a real-life analysis company. Improvements were introduced to the game's artificial intelligence, animation, movements of the game's characters, board requests, competition rules, and financial module. The game's Match Tactics and Set Piece Creator was overhauled. There would also be new social media features.

Development
The game was developed by Sports Interactive and was announced on 7 September 2015. It was released on 13 November 2015 for Microsoft Windows, Mac and Linux. There are also two other Football Manager games set to be released within 2015. Football Manager Touch, which features content from FM 2015'''s Classic mode, will be released for both PC and high-end tablets, and was said to offer a more streamlined experience. The second game is called Football Manager Mobile, which will be released for iOS and Android. A demo for the game was released on 15 November 2015. Players' career progress will be carried to the full version if they decide to purchase the game.

ReceptionFootball Manager 2016 received positive reviews from critics upon release. Aggregate review website Metacritic'' assigned a score of 81 out of 100 based on 34 reviews.

PC Gamer praised the game's vast depth and criticized its lack of accessibility, concluding, "Still untouchable on the footy front but shelf life and that inconsistent 3D engine chip away at its tender achilles." Tom Hatfield of GameSpot praised the game's Create a Club mode, improved user interface, but wrote unfavorably about the game's inaccessibility and lack of speed. The Guardian wrote positively about depth and praised the iterative steps the franchise was making towards accessibility, stating, "The moreish management sim is back featuring its usual tactical depth, but with a more user-friendly road to success – which is bad news for your loved ones."

Sales
Sports Interactive studio director Miles Jacobson announced that Football Manager 2016 had sold its 1 millionth copy on 15 September 2016.

References

External links 
 

2015 video games
Android (operating system) games
2015
MacOS games
Linux games
IOS games
Sega video games
Video games developed in the United Kingdom
Windows games
Video games with Steam Workshop support